Saint-Étienne-Châteaucreux station (French: Gare de Saint-Étienne-Châteaucreux)  is the main railway station in the town of Saint-Étienne. The station is situated in Châteaucreux, a little outside the centre of Saint-Étienne. The station is linked to the town centre by the town's second tramway line. It is situated at a junction of railway lines: Moret–Lyon (via Nevers and Roanne), and lines to Clermont-Ferrand and Le Puy-en-Velay.

History
Châteaucreux was built in 1855 in classical style by architect Joseph-Antoine Bouvard for the PLM. The building is a sculpted metal structure filed with coloured bricks. It was built this way due to the subsidence of the ground. The station's passenger hall has kept its original features.

Destinations

Grandes Lignes (Intercity):
 Saint-Étienne - Paris. TGV service.

TER Auvergne-Rhône-Alpes (regional services):
 Saint-Étienne - Firminy - Le Puy-en-Velay
 Saint-Étienne - Montbrison - Boën
 Saint-Étienne - Givors - Lyon
 Saint-Étienne - Roanne

References

External links
 

Railway stations in Auvergne-Rhône-Alpes
Buildings and structures in Saint-Étienne
Railway stations in France opened in 1855